is a railway station in Shimizu-ku, Shizuoka City, Shizuoka Prefecture, Japan, operated by Central Japan Railway Company (JR Tōkai).

Lines
Yui Station is served by the Tōkaidō Main Line, and is located 158.4 kilometers from the starting point of the line at Tokyo Station.

Station layout
The station has two side platforms serving Track 1 and Track 4, and an island platform between them serving Track 2 and Track 3. The platforms are connected to the station building by an footbridge. Track 1 and Track 4 are used only during peak hours to all express trains to pass. The station building has automated ticket machines, TOICA automated turnstiles  and a staffed ticket office.

Platforms

Adjacent stations

|-
!colspan=5|Central Japan Railway Company

Station history
Although local residents had petitioned for a station when the section of the Tōkaidō Main Line connecting Shizuoka with Hamamatsu was completed. Yui Station was opened in 1889, the low population and proximity to Kambara Station led to the petition being rejected. However, with the growing importance of agricultural products (green tea, mikan) and Yui's importance as a fishing port, the request for a station was finally granted on April 15, 1916. Regularly scheduled freight service was discontinued in 1971.

Station numbering was introduced to the section of the Tōkaidō Line operated JR Central in March 2018; Yui Station was assigned station number CA12.

Passenger statistics
In fiscal 2017, the station was used by an average of 1,587 passengers daily (boarding passengers only).

Surrounding area
Japan National Route 1
Tōmei Expressway
Tōkaidō highway

See also
 List of Railway Stations in Japan

References

Yoshikawa, Fumio. Tokaido-sen 130-nen no ayumi. Grand-Prix Publishing (2002) .

External links

Official home page

Railway stations in Japan opened in 1916
Tōkaidō Main Line
Stations of Central Japan Railway Company
Railway stations in Shizuoka (city)